Major-General Gerald Russell Smallwood  (18 February 1889 – 3 February 1977) was a senior officer in the British Army who served during both World War I and World War II.

Military career
Smallwood joined the Royal Warwickshire Regiment on 8 April 1911 as a Special Reserve second lieutenant on probation, confirmed in April 1912. In December 1912, after passing his examination, he was transferred to be a regular second lieutenant in the 2nd Battalion, East Yorkshire Regiment. In September 1914, after the outbreak of World War I, he was promoted to temporary lieutenant and later that year seconded to the Army Signal Service. He was promoted to captain in 1915. He was twice mentioned in dispatches during the war, and he was awarded the Military Cross (MC) in the King's 1916 Birthday Honours.

In 1917 and 1919 he twice held the rank of acting Major while commanding a divisional signals company, and in 1920 he was acting lieutenant colonel while still a substantive Captain. In 1922 he left the Signals to attend the Staff College, Camberley, where he encountered many future general officers, including Charles Fullbrook-Leggatt, John Evetts, Thomas Hutton, Keith Simmons and Robert Money. Graduating from Camberley in late 1923, then in 1924 he was appointed to the War Office as Staff Captain. In 1927 he was finally promoted to Major. In 1934, having been promoted to lieutenant colonel, he was appointed to command his old battalion, the 2nd East Yorkshire Regiment. He commanded the battalion, firstly in England and then in Palestine during the Arab revolt in Palestine.

From 1937 to 1939 Smallwood was posted to the British Military Mission to the Egyptian Army. After this posting the King of Egypt made him Commander of the Order of the Nile.

In 1939, at the outbreak of World War II, Brigadier Smallwood commanded the Nigerian Brigade.  By 1940, his brigade was named the 3rd Nigerian Brigade.  In July 1940, under the terms of a war contingency plan, the 3rd Nigerian Brigade was sent to East Africa. There, the Nigerian brigade was joined by two brigades of the King's African Rifles (KAR) to form the 1st African Division.  Smallwood was the acting Commanding Officer of this division during its formation.

When Major-General H. E. de R. Wetherall officially took command of the 1st African Division, Smallwood once again reverted to command of his original brigade, now named the 23rd Nigerian Brigade.

In 1942, Smallwood was promoted to Major-General.

Command history
 1937 to 1939 General Staff Officer 1, British Military Mission to Egypt
 1939 to 1940 Commanding Officer, Nigerian Brigade, West Africa
 1940 Commanding Officer, 3rd Nigerian Brigade, West Africa
 1940 Acting General Officer Commanding, 1st African Division, East Africa
 1940 to 1941 Commanding Officer, 23rd Nigerian Brigade, East Africa
 1942 General Officer Commanding, Madagascar
 1945 Head Training Staff, Greek Army
 1946 Retired

See also
 Royal West African Frontier Force
 East African Campaign (World War II)
 Battle of Madagascar

References

Bibliography

External links

Generals of World War II
SMALLWOOD, Maj.-Gen. Gerald Russell, Who Was Who, A & C Black, 1920–2015 (online edition, Oxford University Press, 2014)

1880s births
1977 deaths
British Army major generals
British Army generals of World War II
British Army personnel of World War I
British expatriates in Madagascar
British expatriates in Nigeria
British military personnel of the 1936–1939 Arab revolt in Palestine
Companions of the Order of the Bath
Companions of the Distinguished Service Order
East Yorkshire Regiment officers
Graduates of the Staff College, Camberley
People from colonial Nigeria
Recipients of the Military Cross
Royal Warwickshire Fusiliers officers
Royal West African Frontier Force officers
People from Kings Norton
Military personnel from Worcestershire